The 2013–14 Irani Cup, also called 2013-14 Irani Trophy, was the 52nd season of the Irani Cup, a first-class cricket competition in India. It was a one-off match which was played from 9 February 2014 to 13 February 2014 between the 2013–14 Ranji champions Karnataka and the Rest of India team. Chinnaswamy Stadium, the home ground of Karnataka, hosted the match. Karnataka won the match by an innings and 222 runs.

Squads

Scorecard

Innings 1

Fall of wickets: 1–0 (Jiwanjot Singh, 0.1 ov), 2–8 (Aparajith, 2.4 ov), 3–12 (Jadhav, 4.1 ov), 4–54 (Gambhir, 23.1 ov), 5–62 (Mandeep Singh, 27.6 ov), 6–129 (Mishra, 48.4 ov), 7–199 (Karthik, 64.1 ov), 8–199 (Karthik, 64.1 ov), 9–201 (Anureet Singh, 65.3 ov), 10–201 (Pankaj Singh, 65.4 ov)

Innings 2

Fall of wickets: 1–0 (Uthappa, 0.5 ov), 2-75 (Rahul, 22.5 ov), 3-136 (Pandey, 38.5 ov), 4-188 (Ganesh Satish, 61.3 ov), 5-375 (Nair, 90.4 ov), 6-400 (Binny, 100.6 ov), 7-488 (Vinay Kumar, 121.2 ov), 8-545 (Gopal, 134.1 ov), 9-606 (Gautam, 144.4 ov), 10-606 (Sharath, 144.6 ov)

Innings 3

Fall of wickets: 1–11 (Gambhir, 2.5 ov), 2-20 (Jiwanjot Singh, 6.2 ov), 3-91 (Jadhav, 27.2 ov), 4-140 (Karthik, 46.3 ov), 5-142 (Mandeep Singh, 46.6 ov), 6-151 (Mishra, 49.2 ov), 7-162 (Harbhajan Singh, 53.5 ov), 8-183 (Aparajith, 57.3 ov), 9-183 (Dinda, 57.4 ov), 10-183 (Pankaj Singh, 57.5 ov)

See also
2013–14 Ranji Trophy

References

External links
Irani Cup, 2013/14 on ESPN Cricinfo

Irani Cup
2014 in Indian cricket
Irani Cup